The Port of Świnoujście (in Polish generally Port Świnoujście ) is a Polish seaport in Świnoujście, Poland at the Baltic Sea located at the Świna strait, on Wolin and Usedom islands. The port has passenger terminal.

In 2006, cargo traffic in the seaport was equaled 9,241,500 tons, and it comprised 15.3% of all cargo traffic in Polish seaports.
In 2007, to the port entered 4619 ships of gross tonnage more than 100.

The Port of Świnoujście and the Port of Szczecin are managed by one authority. Both ports create one of the largest port complexes at the Baltic Sea.

References

External links 
 Szczecin and Świnoujscie Seaports Authority Website (English)

Swinoujscie
Świnoujście
Buildings and structures in West Pomeranian Voivodeship